Pointe-aux-Trembles is a provincial electoral district in the Montreal region of Quebec, Canada that elects members to the National Assembly of Quebec. The district is located at the east point of the Island of Montreal and comprises the city of Montréal-Est and the neighbourhood of Pointe-aux-Trembles in the borough of Rivière-des-Prairies–Pointe-aux-Trembles borough of Montreal.

It was created for the 1989 election from parts of Anjou, Bourget and LaFontaine electoral districts.

In the change from the 2001 to the 2011 electoral map, its territory was unchanged.

In the 1995 Quebec referendum it (under its current boundaries) voted 63% for Quebec to become independent.

Members of the National Assembly

Election results

 Result compared to Action Démocratique 

|-
 
|Liberal
|Richard La Charité
|align="right"|9,110
|align="right"|30.75
|align="right"|-3.49

|-
 
|Socialist Democracy
|Hughes Tremblay
|align="right"|205
|align="right"|0.69
|align="right"|-0.09
|-

|Innovateur
|Claude Laporte
|align="right"|158
|align="right"|0.53
|align="right"|-0.18
|}

|-
 
|Liberal
|Bernard Lauzon 
|align="right"|5,234
|align="right"|34.24
|align="right"|+0.75

|-
 
|Socialist Democracy
|Daniel Pharand
|align="right"|119
|align="right"|0.78
|align="right"|–
|-

|Innovateur
|Claude Laporte
|align="right"|109
|align="right"|0.71
|align="right"|–
|}

|-
 
|Liberal
|José G. Simon
|align="right"|9,965
|align="right"|33.49
|align="right"|-10.46

|-

|Natural Law
|André Gaudet
|align="right"|324
|align="right"|1.09
|align="right"|–
|}

|-
 
|Liberal
|Jean Tondreau
|align="right"|11,968
|align="right"|43.95
|-

|Workers
|Gérald Varichon
|align="right"|659
|align="right"|2.42
|-

|Progressive Conservative
|André Ethier
|align="right"|549
|align="right"|2.02
|-

|United Social Credit
|Mario Gosselin
|align="right"|327
|align="right"|1.20
|}

References

External links
Information
 Elections Quebec

Election results
 Election results (National Assembly)
 Election results (QuébecPolitique)

Maps
 2011 map (PDF)
 2001 map (Flash)
2001–2011 changes (Flash)
1992–2001 changes (Flash)
 Electoral map of Montreal region
 Quebec electoral map, 2011 

Provincial electoral districts of Montreal
Quebec provincial electoral districts
Rivière-des-Prairies–Pointe-aux-Trembles
Montréal-Est, Quebec